Park Se-yoon (born October 16, 1989), more commonly known as Crucial Star, is a South Korean rapper and record producer. He started writing music at the age of 17 and joined the hip hop duo Libra Twins in 2007, before debuting as a solo rapper in 2010. He released his first EP, A Star Goes Up, in 2011.

Biography
Park Se-yoon was born on October 16, 1989 in Seoul, South Korea. His father is the painter Hang-Ryul Park.

He made his musical debut at the age of seventeen in the hip hop group Libra Twins. Several years later, he signed with independent hip hop label Soul Company, working under the name Crucial Star. He and label mate Mad Clown collaborated on the digital album Mad Clown VS Crucial Star in 2010. The following year, he released his first EP, A Star Goes Up, and his first full-length album, A Star From The Basement.

Following the dissolution of Soul Company in 2012, Crucial Star moved to Grandline Entertainment. While with Grandline, he released two mix tapes, Drawing #1: A Dream Spokesman (2012) and Drawing 2: A Better Man (2013), two albums, FALL (2012) and Midnight (2014), and one EP, Boyhood (2015).

In 2015 he appeared as a contestant on Mnet television rap contest Show Me the Money 4. He was eliminated in the preliminary round after forgetting his lyrics. In October 2015, Crucial Star's agency published a statement announcing that he and Unpretty Rapstar 2 contestant Heize were in a relationship. A week after this announcement, it was reported that they had broken up several months prior.

He left Grandline Entertainment in January 2016 when his contract ended. In April, he signed with C-JeS Entertainment.

Discography

Studio albums

Extended plays

Digital singles 
 Catch Me If U Can [October 11, 2010]
 Champagne [September 16, 2011]
 Nothing Lasts Forever [December 11, 2011]
 Super Crucial Rap 2 [February 3, 2014]
 Three Things I Want To Give You (ft. Sojin of Girl's Day) [March 10, 2014]
 Show Me Your Light (ft. Shin Ji-soo) [April 15, 2014]

As a featured artist
 Andup - That Girl (Feat. Crucial Star)
 Animato & DJ Tiz - I'm Yours (Feat. Crucial Star)
 Bang Yong Guk of B.A.P/Jepp Blackman - Last One (Feat. Crucial Star)
 Basick - You Already Know (Feat. Crucial Star)
 Born Kim - 명품 젠틀맨 (Feat. Jolly V, Crucial Star)
 CZA - Oh Lord (Feat. Crucial Star)
 Dok2 & The Quiett - iPhone Girl (Feat. Crucial Star)
 DJ Dopsh - Grandliner's Cypher (Feat. Crucial Star, Louie of Geeks, Take One)
 DJ Wegun - It's Alright (Feat. Crucial Star)
 Donutman -  Do Your Thang [Lil'wayne - No Love](Feat. Crucial Star)
 Donutman - Love (Feat. Crucial Star)
 Donutman - Stuck On You (She Said) (Feat. Crucial Star)
 Exy - 쓸어버려 (Wipe Out) (Feat. Crucial Star)
 Fatdoo - 인형공장 (Feat. Newchamp, Crucial Star)
 Fatdoo - 16마디 토크쇼 (Feat. Crucial Star, Joker, Italian BOB)
 G-Slow - I Can't Live (Feat. Crucial Star)
 Giriboy - 다른꼴 (Feat. Crucial Star)
 GRAY - 깜빡 (Feat. Zion.T, Crucial Star)
 Geeks- 숨이차 Remix (Feat. Ugly Duck, 화나, Zion.T, Crucial Star, Zico of Block B, DJ Dopsh)
 Geeks- In Front of Your House (Feat. Crucial Star)
 Heize - 조금만 더 방황하고 (Feat. Crucial Star)
 Innovator - Drama Girl (Feat. Crucial Star)
 Jerry.K - Gentleman's Affair [Scary'p - Take Off) (Feat. Innovator, Crucial Star)
 Jerry.K - We Made Us Remix (Feat. Crucial Star & Takeone)
 JJK - 잔인한 노래 (Feat. Crucial Star)
 Lil'boi of Geeks - Star Is Born [Chris Webby - Bounce] (Feat. 단아, Crucial Star)
 Loptimist - Sunshine (Feat. B-Free, Crucial Star)
 Loquence - Can Can't (Feat. Crucial Star)
 Loquence - Change Of my Life Remix [Crucial Star - Change of my life) (Feat. JJK, Crucial Star)
 Loquence - Girlfriend (Feat. Crucial Star)
 Mad Clown - Stars (Feat. Crucial Star)
 Mad Clown - 스토커 (Feat. Crucial Star)
 Minos In Nuol - Oh, My God [Remix 2](Feat. Mad Clown, Crucial Star, Yoosoo)
 Qwala - Put It Down (Feat. Crucial Star)
 Swings - For Mother (Feat. Crucial Star)
 Take One - 이제는 떳떳하다 (Feat. Crucial Star)
 Take One - Grandline Cypher (CD ONLY Bonus Track) (Feat. Geeks, DJ Eager, Crucial Star)
 The Quiett - The Inspiration Remix (Feat. Crucial Star)
 Yankie - Love (Feat. Crucial Star, Paloalto)
 Young Lion - End Up Fuckin (Feat. Crucial Star)
 포에틱 라이센스 - It's Done (Feat. 투지 & Crucial Star)
 소리헤다 (SORIHEDA) - Let It Go (Feat. Mad Clown, Crucial Star)

References

External links

1989 births
Living people
South Korean hip hop record producers
South Korean record producers
South Korean male rappers
Show Me the Money (South Korean TV series) contestants
Rappers from Seoul
South Korean hip hop singers
21st-century South Korean  male singers